New Elliott is an unincorporated community in St. John Township, Lake County, Indiana.

Geography

References

Unincorporated communities in Lake County, Indiana
Unincorporated communities in Indiana